Ahmed Salah Abdou Nada (born December 6, 1986) is an Egyptian swimmer, who specialized in butterfly events. He represented his nation Egypt at the 2008 Summer Olympics, finishing among the top 60 swimmers in the men's 100 m butterfly.

Nada competed for the Egyptian swimming team in the men's 100 m butterfly at the 2008 Summer Olympics in Beijing. He charged his way to the top of the field in 54.48 to clear the FINA-B cut (54.70) by about two tenths of a second (0.2) at the Pan Arab Games one year earlier in Cairo. Swimming in heat two, Nada fought off a sprint challenge against Saudi Arabia's Bader Al-Muhana on the final lap, until both touched the wall in a matching fifth-place time in 55.59. Sharing a tie with Al-Muhana for sixty-first overall in the prelims, Nada did not advance to the semifinals.

References

External links
NBC Olympics Profile

1986 births
Living people
Egyptian male swimmers
Olympic swimmers of Egypt
Swimmers at the 2008 Summer Olympics
Male butterfly swimmers
Sportspeople from Cairo
African Games silver medalists for Egypt
African Games medalists in swimming
African Games bronze medalists for Egypt
Competitors at the 2007 All-Africa Games